Andrei Sergeevich Bantikov (23 October 1914, Moscow Governorate, Russian Empire — 11 December 2002, Saint Petersburg) was a Russian and Soviet painter, a member of the Leningrad Union of Soviet Artists, who lived and worked in Saint Petersburg (former Leningrad), regarded as one of representatives of the Leningrad School of Painting.

Participated in exhibitions since 1939. Member of the society "Studio of Military Art. M.B. Grekov "1952-1962. He painted a lot on the sea theme. He taught: "Leningrad Higher Artistic Industrial School" 1948-51.

See also 
 Leningrad School of Painting
 House of creativity «Staraya Ladoga»
 List of Russian artists
 List of 20th-century Russian painters
 List of painters of Saint Petersburg Union of Artists
 Saint Petersburg Union of Artists

References

Sources 
 1917 — 1957. Выставка произведений ленинградских художников. Каталог. — Л: Ленинградский художник, 1958. — с.8.
 Ленинград. Зональная выставка 1964 года. Каталог. — Л: Художник РСФСР, 1965. — с.10.
 Изобразительное искусство Ленинграда. Каталог выставки. — Л: Художник РСФСР, 1976. — с.14.
 Выставка произведений художников - ветеранов Великой Отечественной войны. - Л: ЛОСХ РСФСР, 1978. - 3.
 Directory of Members of the Union of Artists of USSR. Vol. 1. - Moscow: Soviet artist, 1979. P.91.
 Зональная выставка произведений ленинградских художников 1980 года. Каталог. — Л: Художник РСФСР, 1983. — с.9.
 Выставка произведений художников - ветеранов Великой Отечественной войны. - Л: ЛОСХ РСФСР, 1987. - с.3.
 Directory of members of the Leningrad branch of Union of Artists of Russian Federation. - Leningrad: Khudozhnik RSFSR, 1987. P.10.
 Государственный Русский музей. Живопись. Первая половина ХХ века. Каталог. А—В. СПб, Palace Editions. 1997. С. 41.
 Выставка произведений художников — ветеранов Великой Отечественной войны. СПб, 1998.
 Matthew Cullerne Bown. A Dictionary of Twentieth Century Russian And Soviet Painters. 1900 — 1980s. — London: Izomar Limited, 1998.
 Выставка, посвященная 55-летию победы в Великой Отечественной войне. СПб, 2000. С. 3.
 Мы помним… Художники, искусствоведы – участники Великой Отечественной войны. – М: Союз художников России, 2000. – с.34-35.
 Художники - городу. Выставка к 70-летию Санкт-Петербургского Союза художников. Каталог. - Санкт-Петербург: Петрополь, 2003. - с.178.
 Sergei V. Ivanov. Unknown Socialist Realism. The Leningrad School. Saint Petersburg, NP-Print Edition, 2007. P.18, 385-387, 392. , .
 Юбилейный Справочник выпускников Санкт-Петербургского академического института живописи, скульптуры и архитектуры имени И. Е. Репина Российской Академии художеств. 1915—2005. — Санкт Петербург: «Первоцвет», 2007. — с.52.

1914 births
2002 deaths
Soviet military personnel of World War II
Socialist realist artists
20th-century Russian painters
Russian male painters
21st-century Russian painters
Soviet painters
Members of the Leningrad Union of Artists
Repin Institute of Arts alumni
Painters from Saint Petersburg
Leningrad School artists
20th-century Russian male artists
21st-century Russian male artists